Air Marshal Sir John Tremayne Babington,  (20 July 1891 – 20 March 1979) was a senior commander in the Royal Air Force. In 1944, he retired and the following year changed his name to Tremayne, his mother's maiden name, to avoid confusion with his younger brother, Philip Babington.

He was educated at Osborne and Dartmouth Royal Navy colleges.

RAF career
Babington was commissioned as a Midshipman in the Royal Navy in 1908. During the First World War, Babington was a member of the Royal Naval Air Service. He participated in the air raid on the Friedrichshaven Airship Factory, Germany on 21 November 1914. On 2 January 1920, Babington was removed from the Navy List and awarded a permanent commission in the Royal Air Force. He was appointed Station Commander at RAF Gosport in 1927 and went on to be a Station Commander in Iraq in January 1929 before becoming British Air Representative to the League of Nations in November 1929. He became Station Commander of RAF Halton and Commandant, No. 1 School of Technical Training in 1934, Air Officer Commanding No. 24 Group in 1936 and Air Officer Commanding, RAF Far East Command in 1938.

He served in the Second World War as Air Officer Commanding-in-Chief Technical Training Command and then Head of RAF Mission in Moscow before retiring in 1944.

In retirement served as High Sheriff of Cornwall.

References

External websites

Air Marshal Sir John Tremayne/Babington

|-
 

1891 births
1979 deaths
Royal Air Force air marshals of World War II
Military of Singapore under British rule
Knights Commander of the Order of the Bath
Commanders of the Order of the British Empire
Companions of the Distinguished Service Order
Commandeurs of the Légion d'honneur
Deputy Lieutenants of Cornwall
High Sheriffs of Cornwall
People from Marylebone
Royal Naval Air Service aviators
Royal Navy officers
Royal Navy officers of World War I
Jojn Tremayne